Mabe may refer to:

Places:
Mabe, Virginia, a community in Virginia, United States
Mabe, Cornwall, a village and civil parish in west Cornwall, United Kingdom
Mabe, Nepal, a village development committee
Mabë, a settlement in the Lezhë District, Albania

People
Tom Mabe, American comedian

Other uses:
Mabe (surname)
Mattias "Mäbe" Johansson, a founding member of the Swedish metal band Dissection
Mabe (company), a Mexican-based company which designs, produces and distributes appliances around the world
 A fictional village in the video game The Legend of Zelda: Link's Awakening